Kiki Bertens and Johanna Larsson were the defending champions, but Bertens chose not to participate this year. Larsson played alongside Eugenie Bouchard, but lost in the first round to Rika Fujiwara and Darija Jurak.

Alexa Guarachi and Desirae Krawczyk won the title, defeating Lara Arruabarrena and Timea Bacsinszky in the final, 4–6, 6–4, [10–6]. This was the first WTA Tour title for both Guarachi and Krawczyk.

Seeds

Draw

Draw

References
 Main Draw

Ladies Championship Gstaad - Doubles
2018 Doubles